This is a list of candidates of the 2018 South Australian state election. The election was held on 17 March 2018.

Retiring MPs

Labor
 Michael Atkinson MHA (Croydon) 
 Paul Caica MHA (Colton)
 Steph Key MHA (Ashford)
 Jennifer Rankine MHA (Wright)
 Jack Snelling MHA (Playford)
Leesa Vlahos MHA (Taylor)
 Gail Gago MLC
 John Gazzola MLC

Liberal
 Mark Goldsworthy MHA (Kavel)
 Steven Griffiths MHA (Goyder)
 Michael Pengilly MHA (Finniss)
 Isobel Redmond MHA (Heysen)
 Mitch Williams MHA (MacKillop)

Independent
Martin Hamilton-Smith MHA (Waite)

House of Assembly 
Sitting members of the South Australian House of Assembly are shown in bold text. Successful candidates are highlighted in the relevant colour; where there is possible confusion, an asterisk is used.

Legislative Council 
Sitting members of the South Australian Legislative Council are shown in bold text. Tickets that elected at least one member are highlighted in the relevant colour and successful candidates are indicated with an asterisk (*). Eleven of twenty-two seats were up for election. The Labor Party was defending four seats. The Liberals was defending four seats. The Greens, Australian Conservatives (who absorbed Family First since the last election) and Dignity Party were each defending one seat.

See also
Candidates of the South Australian state election, 2014

References
House of Assembly candidates
Legislative Council candidates
Labor candidates: sa.alp.org.au
Liberal candidates: saliberal.org.au
SA Best candidates: sabest.org.au
Green candidates: greens.org.au
Dignity candidates: dignityparty.org.au
Conservative candidates: conservatives.org.au
Election guide: pollbludger.net

Notes

External links
Electoral Commission SA: 2018 State Election
ABC Elections: SA Election 2018
SA election calculator

2018 elections in Australia
Candidates for South Australian state elections
2010s in South Australia